Michelle Ross may refer to:
Michelle Ross-Cope, a British athlete,
Michelle Ross (drag queen), a Canadian drag entertainer.